Diego Marabelli (23 February 1914 – 12 July 2006) was an Italian racing cyclist. He won stage 16 of the 1938 Giro d'Italia.

References

External links
 

1914 births
2006 deaths
Italian male cyclists
Italian Giro d'Italia stage winners
Cyclists from the Province of Pavia